Microtubule-associated protein RP/EB family member 3 is a protein that in humans is encoded by the MAPRE3 gene.

The protein encoded by this gene is a member of the RP/EB family of genes.  The protein localizes to the cytoplasmic microtubule network and binds APCL, a homolog of the adenomatous polyposis coli tumor suppressor gene.

References

Further reading